Blue Head is a live album by saxophonist David "Fathead" Newman's Quartet plus Clifford Jordan recorded at the 5th Annual Riverside Park Arts Festival in 1989 and released on the Candid label.

Reception

In his review for AllMusic, Scott Yanow states "The distinctive tenors David Newman and Clifford Jordan make for a potent team on this live jam session set which finds Jordan sitting in with Newman's quartet ... The six performances each clock in between 11 and 15 minutes with plenty of stretching out for the two veteran saxophonists ... Easily recommended to straightahead jazz fans".

Track listing 
 "Strike Up the Band" (George Gershwin, Ira Gershwin) – 11:10
 "Blue Head" (David "Fathead" Newman) – 14:13
 "Willow Weep for Me" (Ann Ronell) – 12:59
 "Blues for David" (Buddy Montgomery) – 12:07
 "What's New?" (Bob Haggart, Johnny Burke) – 11:50
 "Eye Witness Blues" (Clifford Jordan) – 11:16

Personnel 
David "Fathead" Newman – alto saxophone, tenor saxophone, flute
Clifford Jordan – tenor saxophone, soprano saxophone 
Ted Dunbar – guitar
Charles "Buddy" Montgomery – piano
Todd Coolman - bass
Marvin "Smitty" Smith  – drums

References 

David "Fathead" Newman live albums
Clifford Jordan live albums
1990 live albums
Candid Records live albums